Random and Whacky is an Australian comedy television program for children and teenagers. It first screened on 10 Peach (previously Eleven) on 4 June 2017.

The series is set in a top-secret agency, where super agents Cameron, Sunshine, Wil, Kayla and Shayla provide solutions to problems faced by children. They team is focused on brainstorming, thinking things through from different perspectives and working with often providing unconventional solutions to conventional problems.

Production for the second series began in 2018 and screened in 2019.

Cast
 Ben Bennett as Wil
 Eliza Goslett as Kayla
 Matilda Goslett as Shayla
 Thuso Lekwape as Cameron 
 Eliza Nicholls as Sunshine
 Nicholas Hope as Nigel

Series overview

References

External links
 

2017 Australian television series debuts
Children's fantasy television series
Australian fantasy television series
English-language television shows
10 Peach original programming
Television shows set in Sydney